Arqueen (also Romanized as Arkūyen and Arkowyen; also known as Arkaun, Arkavin, Arkovīn, Arqueen, Arkūten, and Darkovīn) is a village in Ijrud-e Pain Rural District, Halab District, Ijrud County, Zanjan Province, Iran. At the 2006 census, its population was 217, in 75 families.

References 

Populated places in Ijrud County